The Minister of Internal Affairs of Azerbaijan is the head of the Ministry of Internal Affairs of Azerbaijan. The person in this position is appointed and dismissed from the post by the President of Azerbaijan.

Ministers

Azerbaijan Democratic Republic

Azerbaijan Soviet Socialist Republic

Republic of Azerbaijan

See also 

 Minister of Foreign Affairs (Azerbaijan)
 Ministry of Defence (Azerbaijan)
 Ministry of Internal Affairs (Azerbaijan)

References 

Internal affairs ministries
Government ministries of Azerbaijan